Glaucorhoe is a genus of moths in the family Geometridae erected by Claude Herbulot in 1951.

References

Xanthorhoini